During the 2004–05 English football season, Rotherham United F.C. competed in the Football League Championship.

Season summary
During the 2004–05 season, the club struggled and spent most of the season bottom of the league. The club was bought by the consortium, Millers 05. Ronnie Moore left by mutual consent during the campaign, after his team were rooted to the bottom of the division for the majority of the season.

After relegation to League One in April 2005, Mick Harford took over as Millers manager.

Final league table

Results
Rotherham United's score comes first

Legend

Football League Championship

FA Cup

League Cup

First-team squad
Squad at end of season

Left club during season

Notes

References

Rotherham United F.C. seasons
Rotherham United F.C.